Arisaema serratum is a species of flowering plant in the arum family (Araceae). It is native Japan, where it is found from the Kansai region north to the island of Hokkaido. Its natural habitat is damp forests.

Arisaema serratum is a perennial. It produces two leaves, with 7-13 leaflets each. The color of the flowering bract is variable, being either purple or green. It blooms from May to June.

It is similar to Arisaema mayebarae, which is restricted to Kyushu (an island where Arisaema serratum is not present). Arisaema serratum can be distinguished by its shorter spathe blade, which declines over the tip of the mouth (as opposed to being held at a horizontal angle).

Subspecies
Arisaema serratum var. atropurpureum 
Arisaema serratum var. izuense 
Arisaema serratum var. serratum
Arisaema serratum var. suwoense

Toxicity
All parts of A. serratum contain needle-like calcium oxalate crystals, saponins, and coniine. Toxicity is especially concentrated in the underground bulb; touching the juice causes inflammation. Ingestion results in intense pain from the mouth to the throat, making it impossible to swallow. Symptoms include diarrhea, vomiting, and respiratory paralysis; severe cases can be fatal.

References

serratum